Big Cheese is an independent music magazine published in the United Kingdom that covers alternative music including rock, punk, and metal. It is circulated monthly.

Features
Big Cheese was one of the first monthly UK magazines to feature the likes of My Chemical Romance, Brand New, Turbonegro, Panic! at the Disco, The Movie Live, Alexisonfire and Taking Back Sunday. Since its creation, Big Cheese has offered bespoke covermount incentives to its readers, such as giving away a strictly limited My Chemical Romance patch to celebrate the release of their latest album, giving  Green Day fans exclusive free band-branded wristbands, as well as being one of the first magazines to offer a downloadable compilation CD to its readers completely free.

Personnel

Staff 
The staff of the magazine include:
 Jim Sharples - "Features" editor
 Ian Chaddock - News/Online editor
 Paul Hagen - "Reviews" editor

References

External links
 Official Website

1996 establishments in the United Kingdom
Bi-monthly magazines published in the United Kingdom
Independent magazines
Magazines established in 1996
Magazines published in London
Music magazines published in the United Kingdom